Warriors of the Deep is the first serial of the 21st season of the British science fiction television series Doctor Who, which was broadcast in four twice-weekly parts on BBC1 from 5 to 13 January 1984.

In the serial, two human power blocs, along with members of the Silurians and Sea Devils, the original rulers of the Earth, battle for control over the nuclear missiles on an undersea military colony on Earth in 2084.

Plot

In 2084, Earth is divided into two opposing superpower blocs. One of the blocs has created a secret underwater base, Sea Base 4, which is strategically positioned and has nuclear weapons aimed at the opposing bloc. The base's crew is led by Commander Vorshak and his senior officers, Nilson, Bulic, Security Chief Preston and Lt. Michaels, who is killed prior to the story commencing. The story begins on the bridge of Sea Base 4. Vorshak and Bulic noticed something strange on their long range sensors, but dismiss it as being a trivial glitch. In reality, the glitch is a Silurian battlecruiser led by Icthar, the sole survivor of the Silurian Triad and his subordinates, Tarpok and Scibus, who are monitoring Sea Base 4.

Inside the TARDIS, Turlough has changed his mind about going home, and the Fifth Doctor plans to show Tegan something of Earth's future. As the TARDIS materialises in space, it is attacked by Sentinel Six, a robot weapons system. The Doctor saves the TARDIS by materialising on Sea Base 4.

Sea Base 4 undergoes a practice missile run, but Maddox, the temporary sync operator, is uncertain of his skill at the job. When Maddox faints after the practice run, Vorshak realises that the function of the base will continue to be compromised until either Maddox lives up to his duties or a replacement is assigned. Nilson and the Base's chief medical officer, Doctor Solow, who are enemy agents for the opposing bloc, plan to program Maddox to destroy the computer circuitry. To do this, they ask Vorshak to release Maddox's duplicate program disk under the pretext of helping the sync operator cope with his job. Vorshak does so, and Maddox is programmed in the Base's psycho-surgery unit. 
Turlough summons a lift, alerting the crew of his and the Doctor's presence - they are captured by Preston.

The Silurians revive the Sea Devil warriors of Elite Group One and their brilliant commander, Sauvix. The Silurians and Sea Devils launch an attack on the base and the Doctor, recognising their ship on the monitor screen, tries to warn Vorshak not to fire on them. Vorshak ignores him, and, as a result, the Base's defences are neutralised by the Silurians' deflection beam. The Silurians then dispatch the Myrka, a large marine monster, who attacks Airlock 1, and the Sea Devils, who assault Airlock 5 of the sea base. During the attacks, Solow and Nilson activate Maddox, who tampers with the equipment. When Ensign Karina becomes suspicious, Nilson makes Maddox kill her. The Myrka makes its way towards the bridge, killing people by electrocution, including Doctor Solow, but the Doctor eventually destroys the Myrka by using an ultraviolet light generator.

The Silurians prime a device called the manipulator and prepare to arrive on the base. The Sea Devils break through Airlock 5 and start the push for the bridge, killing all that stand in their way. Solow's accomplice, Nilson, is revealed as a traitor and he attempts to escape by taking Tegan hostage but the Doctor blinds him with the ultraviolet device. A group of Sea Devils arrive and kill Nilson, while Tegan and the Doctor are taken as prisoners to the bridge, which is now under the control of the Silurians.

The Doctor recognises Icthar and confronts him about the massacre of the crew of Sea Base 4. Icthar reveals his group intends to get mankind to destroy itself by triggering a global war. The Doctor escapes from the bridge and tries to find something to use against the reptiles. He discovers some cylinders of hexachromite gas, which is lethal to all reptile life. Preston urges the Doctor to use the gas on all of the Silurians and Sea Devils. The Doctor adamantly refuses and accuses Preston of advocating genocide. The Doctor changes his mind when Turlough reminds him of what the Silurians intend to do if they launch the missiles.  When he is unable to find anything else less lethal, he begins to connect the gas containers to a central air pump. The Doctor is discovered by Sauvix before he can turn the pump on, Preston is killed by Sauvix, who is sprayed with gas and killed by Bulic. As the Silurians prepare to fire the missiles, the Doctor feeds the gas into the ventilation system. Bulic stays in the chemical store to ensure that the gas keeps flowing, while the Doctor and his companions leave for the bridge to try to stop the Silurians.

The warriors begin to collapse from the gas and the Doctor tells Tegan and Turlough to give the Silurians oxygen to keep them alive. The Doctor, aided by Vorshak, tries to stop the missiles by linking himself into the equipment as the sync operator. The Doctor succeeds, but Vorshak is killed by Icthar, who himself is killed by Turlough, leaving Doctor, his companions and Bulic the only survivors. Left in despair, the Doctor remarks, "There should have been another way."

Production

Early in the production of the story, Prime Minister Margaret Thatcher announced the 1983 United Kingdom general election. This created a sudden demand for BBC studio space and, as a result, the production schedule for the story unexpectedly lost two weeks.  Production was completed, but many signs of hurried production are evident. Many scenes had little or no rehearsal, and many scenes received only one take. One of the biggest problems came with the Myrka costume, which was completed only about an hour before it was scheduled to be used, meaning that the two puppeteers inside could not be fitted and had no time to rehearse in it. The costume smelled strongly of paint and adhesive, which one puppeteer said made him feel like he was sniffing glue. The paint on the costume had not dried by the time filming started, and tended to rub off on the sets and other costumes, as can be spotted in several scenes.

Many in the cast and production crew have expressed a sense of disappointment with the quality of the finished show; the DVD commentary by visual effects designer Mat Irvine, script editor Eric Saward, Peter Davison and Janet Fielding contained many criticisms of Pennant Roberts' direction of the story and John Nathan-Turner's production of the programme, as well as comments on the special effects, sets and other production problems (the Myrka specifically caused a great deal of amusement). The scenes with the Myrka in Part Three were also later used by former BBC One controller Michael Grade during his appearance on Room 101 as an example of why he found Doctor Who pathetic and wanted to get rid of it. Scriptwriter Johnny Byrne was unhappy with numerous alterations and edits that Eric Saward made to his script, notably the deaths of the human characters of Preston and Commander Vorshak, who were originally intended to survive. However, in an interview for the DVD's extra features, Byrne said he thought that the basic story was quite solid and effective.

This story was Byrne's final televised Doctor Who story. Byrne later submitted a pitch entitled The Guardians Of Prophecy, which was a sequel to The Keeper of Traken (1981), featuring the Sixth Doctor battling an evil immortal with an army of Melkurs who were threatening the remainder of the Traken Union. However, Byrne did not develop this submission any further. The Guardians of Prophecy was later 'recreated' as part of the Big Finish series of "Lost Stories". Warriors of the Deep was shot on 1-inch Type C videotape, the first Doctor Who story to do so. Type C videotape replaced 2-inch Quadruplex videotape on Doctor Who and many other shows.

Cast notes
Stuntman Gareth Milne, who had played George Cranleigh in Black Orchid (1982), doubled for Peter Davison when the Doctor fell in the tank at the climax of episode one. Ingrid Pitt, who played Dr. Solow, had previously played Queen Galleia in The Time Monster (1972) alongside Jon Pertwee. Vincent Brimble who played Tarpok later played Gerald in "Village of the Angels" (2021) alongside Jodie Whittaker. Stuart Blake who played Scibus, previously appeared in the 1983 Special The Five Doctors as a Commander and appeared with Tom Baker as Zoldaz in State of Decay (1980). 

It was during production of this story that Peter Davison and Janet Fielding announced to Nathan-Turner their departures from the series.

Commercial releases

In print

This story, originally written by Johnny Byrne, was novelised by former Doctor Who script editor Terrance Dicks and published by Target Books in 1984. Dicks gives a long recap of the Doctor's past with the Silurians and confirms Icthar is indeed the survivor of their first encounter. Dicks also specifies that the two opposing human superpowers are the East and West blocs, something that is left ambiguous in the televised story. The book was re-released in 1992 with new cover art by Alister Pearson.

In 1995 the novel was also issued by BBC Audio as an audio book, read by Peter Davison.

Home media
Warriors of the Deep was released on VHS in September 1995. The story's original soundtrack was released on CD along with Doctor Who and the Silurians (1970) and The Sea Devils (1972) as part of the 'Monsters on Earth' tin set in October 2006 and linking narration was provided by Janet Fielding. The CD was re-issued individually in January 2008. The serial was released on DVD as part of a boxed set called Beneath the Surface with Doctor Who and the Silurians and The Sea Devils on 14 January 2008. This serial was also released as part of the Doctor Who DVD Files in Issue 83 on 7 March 2012.

References

External links

Reviews

Target novelisation

On Target – Warriors of the Deep

Fifth Doctor serials
1984 British television episodes
Television series about dinosaurs
Doctor Who stories set on Earth
Fiction set in 2084
Television series about nuclear war and weapons